Eleutherodactylus martinicensis is a species of frog in the family Eleutherodactylidae found in Antigua and Barbuda, Dominica, Guadeloupe, Martinique, and Saint Lucia.
Its natural habitats are subtropical or tropical dry forests, subtropical or tropical moist lowland forests, subtropical or tropical moist montane forests, subtropical or tropical moist shrubland, subtropical or tropical seasonally wet or flooded lowland grassland, arable land, pastureland, plantations, rural gardens, urban areas, and heavily degraded former forests.
It is threatened by habitat loss.

References

External links

Eleutherodactylus martinicensis at the Encyclopedia of Life

martinicensis
Amphibians of the Caribbean
Amphibians described in 1838
Taxonomy articles created by Polbot